Gennady Bessonov may refer to:

Gennady Bessonov (athlete) (born 1944), Russian Olympic triple jumper
Gennady Bessonov (weightlifter) (born 1954), Russian weightlifter